Tom Pugh or Thomas Pugh may refer to:

 Tom Pugh (cricketer) (1937–2016), English cricketer and rackets player
 Tom Pugh (politician) (born 1949), Minnesota politician
 Tom Pugh (footballer) (born 2000), Welsh footballer
 Thomas Pugh (politician), Colonial American politician; delegate to the Fifth North Carolina Provincial Congress in 1776